is a railway station in the city of Morioka, Iwate Prefecture, Japan, operated by the Iwate Ginga Railway.

Lines
Kuriyagawa Station is served by the Iwate Ginga Railway Line, and is located 5.6 rail kilometers from the terminus of the line at Morioka Station and 540.9 rail kilometers from Tokyo Station. Trains of the JR East Hanawa Line, which officially terminates at  usually continue on to Morioka Station, stopping at all intermediate stations, including Kuriyagawa Station.

Station layout
Kuriyagawa Station has one island platform and one side platform connected to the station building by a footbridge.  The station is staffed.

Platforms

History
Kuriyagawa Station was opened on November 1, 1918. The station was absorbed into the JR East network upon the privatization of the Japanese National Railways (JNR) on 1 April 1987 and was transferred to the Iwate Ginga Railway on 1 September 2002.

Passenger statistics
In fiscal 2015, the station was used by an average of 2967 passengers daily.

Surrounding area
Kuriyagawa Post Office
 Iwate-Kenpoku Bus Morioka Bus office
  Japan National Route 4

See also
 List of Railway Stations in Japan

References

External links

  

Railway stations in Iwate Prefecture
Iwate Galaxy Railway Line
Railway stations in Japan opened in 1918
Morioka, Iwate